Bill Manchuk (born September 1, 1947 in Edmonton, Alberta) was a linebacker who played twelve seasons for the Saskatchewan Roughriders and the Edmonton Eskimos of the Canadian Football League. He won two Grey Cups for the Eskimos. Manchuk played his university football with the University of Alberta Golden Bears.

External links
 https://web.archive.org/web/20080226093521/http://www.edmontoneskimoalumni.com/watn_manchuk.htm

1947 births
Living people
Alberta Golden Bears football players
Canadian football linebackers
Edmonton Elks players
Players of Canadian football from Alberta
Saskatchewan Roughriders players
Canadian football people from Edmonton
Canadian people of Ukrainian descent